The discography of the British punk rock band the Clash consists of six studio albums, two extended plays, two live albums and 31 singles.

1977–1978
The Clash's first official recording was the single for "White Riot", released by CBS Records in March 1977. In April, CBS released their self-titled debut album, The Clash, in the United Kingdom, but refused to release it in the United States, saying that the sound was not "radio friendly". A US version of the album with a modified track listing—four songs from the original version were replaced with five non-album singles and B-sides—was released by Epic Records in 1979, after the UK original became the best-selling import album of all time in the United States. Terry Chimes left the band for the second time soon after the recording, so only Joe Strummer, Mick Jones and Paul Simonon were featured on the album's cover, and Chimes was credited as "Tory Crimes". The album ranked number 12 on the UK Albums Chart and number 126 on the Billboard Pop albums chart.

In the same month, the band also released an EP single, Capital Radio, which was given away to NMEs readers. In May, CBS released the single "Remote Control" without asking them first, and, in September, "Complete Control", produced by Lee "Scratch" Perry, was Topper Headon's first recording with the band. It rose to number 28 on the British Singles Chart.

In February 1978, the band came out with the single "Clash City Rockers". June saw the release of "(White Man) In Hammersmith Palais". The Clash second album, Give 'Em Enough Rope, was released by CBS and produced by Sandy Pearlman in November, receiving largely positive reviews. It hit number 2 in the UK, and number 128 on the Billboard chart. The album's first UK single, "Tommy Gun", rose to number 19.

1979–1982 
In February 1979, CBS released the single, "English Civil War", and in May the EP, The Cost of Living. In August and September 1979, the Clash recorded their third studio album, London Calling. Produced by Guy Stevens, the double album was a mix of different styles, with greater maturity and production polish. London Calling, released in December 1979 by CBS and regarded as one of the greatest rock albums ever recorded, reached number 9 on the British chart and number 27 on the US chart. In the UK, London Callings title track, released a few days before the album's release, rose to number 11—the highest position any Clash single reached in the UK before the band's breakup. The album's final track, "Train in Vain"—included at the last minute and thus not appearing in the track listing on the cover—was released in the Netherlands, Germany, Spain, Brazil, New Zealand, and Australia in June 1980. The single was not released in the UK, and in the US was backed with "London Calling". It turned out to be the band's biggest US hit to date, reaching number 23 on the Billboard chart.

In August, the band came out with another single, "Bankrobber", which reached number 12 in the UK. In October, Epic released the compilation album Black Market Clash, only in the US. The compilation reached number 74 in the US. In the following November, CBS released the single "The Call Up", which reached number 40 in the UK. In December, CBS released the 3-LP, 36-song Sandinista!. The album again reflected a broad range of musical styles, including extended dubs and the first forays into rap by a major rock band. Produced by the band members with the participation of Mikey Dread, Sandinista! was their most controversial album to date, both politically and musically. The album fared well in America, charting at number 24.

During 1981, the band came out with a single, "Hitsville UK". Released in January, the single reached number 56 in the UK and number 53 on the US Mainstream Rock chart. In April, CBS released the single for the song "The Magnificent Seven" which peaked at number 34 on the UK Singles Chart in 1981, and at number 21 on the US Billboard Club Play Singles in 1982. In the same month, CBS released the 12-inch single "The Magnificent Dance". In November, CBS released the single, "This Is Radio Clash", which further demonstrated their ability to mix diverse influences such as dub and hip hop. It reached number 47 on the UK Singles Chart.

They set to work on their fifth studio album in the fall of 1981. Combat Rock was originally planned to be a 2-LP set with the title Rat Patrol from Fort Bragg, but were unable to mix it to either the group's or to CBS's satisfaction. Glyn Johns, brought in by manager Bernie Rhodes to edit and mix the album, reconceived it as a single LP and had Joe Strummer re-record several vocals. In April 1982, the band released the first single from the album, "Know Your Rights", which reached number 43 in the UK. The album contains two "US-radio friendly" singles, "Should I Stay or Should I Go" and "Rock the Casbah". "Should I Stay or Should I Go" reached number 17 in the UK and number 45 on the US Billboard Hot 100 chart, while "Rock the Casbah" peaked at number 17 in the UK and number 8 on the US Billboard Hot 100. The album itself was the band's most successful, hitting number 2 in the UK and number 7 in the US.

1983–present
After Combat Rock was released, Topper Headon was asked to leave the band, and then in September 1983, Mick Jones was fired. The first single from Cut the Crap, "This Is England", was released by CBS in September 1985. It reached number 24 in the UK. Cut the Crap, the last studio album of the band, actually composed by Strummer, Simonon, Pete Howard, Nick Sheppard, and Vince White, was produced by manager Bernard Rhodes and released by CBS in November. It reached number 16 in the UK and number 88 in the US. The Clash effectively disbanded in early 1986.

In 1988, Epic released the double-disc, 28-track compilation The Story of the Clash, Volume 1 presenting a relatively thorough overview of their career. In March 1991, a reissue of "Should I Stay or Should I Go" gave the band its first and only number 1 UK single. In the same year, CBS and Epic released the triple-disc, 64-song box set Clash on Broadway that covers their entire career, and the compilation album The Singles, that includes all their singles, except for 1985's "This Is England". In 1993, Epic released Super Black Market Clash, a compilation that contains B-sides and rare tracks not available on their other albums. In 1999, Epic released the compilation album of live material, From Here to Eternity: Live.

The Clash: Westway to the World, a documentary film about the band, was released by Sony Music Entertainment in 2000, and, in 2003, it won the Grammy Award for the best long form music video. In 2003, Epic and Sony BMG released The Essential Clash, a career-spanning greatest hits album and DVD, dedicated to Joe Strummer, who died during the production of the album. In 2004, Sony Legacy released London Calling: 25th Anniversary Edition. It contains The Vanilla Tapes, missing recordings made by the band in mid-1979 during the London Calling sessions, as a bonus disc, and a DVD featuring the making of the album, the music videos for "London Calling", "Train in Vain" and "Clampdown", and video footage of The Clash recording sessions in Wessex Studios. In 2006, Sony BMG released the box set Singles Box which includes all the singles that they released in the UK. In 2007, Sony BMG released The Singles that presents a stripped-down view of the singles of the band. In 2008, Sony Music Entertainment released The Clash Live: Revolution Rock, produced and directed by Don Letts, it features live material and interviews from 1978 to 1983, and, in October, the live album Live at Shea Stadium, which features the recording of the band's second night at Shea Stadium in 1982.

September 2013 saw the arrival of three releases by The Clash: the 12-CD box set Sound System, featuring the band's entire studio catalogue re-mastered (minus Cut the Crap), plus three extra CDs, one DVD and various other materials; 5 Album Studio Set, featuring the band's first five studio albums re-mastered; and the 2-CD, 33-song best of collection The Clash Hits Back. All the music within the three releases had been remastered, mainly by Mick Jones, from the original tapes. Sound System had an enthusiastic reception, and both the 12-CD box set and the best of compilation both entered the UK Albums Chart.

Studio albums

Live albums

Compilations

Box sets

Extended plays

SinglesNotesA"London Calling" and "Train in Vain" charted together on the Billboard Hot Dance Club Play chart.B"The Magnificent Seven", "The Magnificent Dance", "The Call Up" and "The Cool Out" charted together on the Billboard Hot Dance Club Play chart.C"Rock the Casbah" and "Mustapha Dance" charted together on the Billboard Hot Dance Club Play chart.

 Video albums 

Film/documentaries

Music videos

See also
 List of The Clash songs
 The Clash on film
 No. 10, Upping St.
 Live at Acton Town Hall

References

Notes

SourcesBooks 
 
 
 
 
 
 Awards  Enter Clash in the field Search. Select Artist in the field Search by. Select Album or Single in the field By Format. Click Search.
 
 

 
  Click on Charts, then Songs or Alben.
  Click on Classements, then Songs or Alben.
 
 
  Biilboard Albums and Singles, and Grammy Awards.
 For London Calling For Sandinista! For Combat Rock For Cut the Crap 
 
 
 
 
 
 
 
 
 Enter Clash in the field Search by Artist, then click search.
 
  Enter Clash in the field Name of artist. Select All in the field Format. Click Search.

 

 Journals and magazines 
 
 
 
 
 
 
 
 
 Videos'

External links

 
 [ The Clash] discography at AllMusic
 
 The Clash discography at Rate Your Music

Discography
Discographies of British artists
Clash, The